Bolivia competed at the 2004 Summer Olympics in Athens, Greece from 13 to 29 August 2004.

Athletics 

Bolivian athletes have so far achieved qualifying standards in the following athletics events (up to a maximum of 3 athletes in each event at the 'A' Standard, and 1 at the 'B' Standard). 

Men

Women

Gymnastics

Artistic
Bolivia qualified a female gymnast.

Judo

Bolivia has qualified a single judoka through a tripartite invitation.

Shooting

Swimming 

Men

Women

See also
 Bolivia at the 2003 Pan American Games

References

External links
Official Report of the XXVIII Olympiad
Bolivian Olympic Committee 

Nations at the 2004 Summer Olympics
2004 Summer Olympics
Summer Olympics